The Kegaska River is a salmon river flowing on North shore of Estuary of Saint Lawrence. It crosses the unorganized territory of Petit-Mécatina, in the Le Golfe-du-Saint-Laurent Regional County Municipality, in the administrative region in the Côte-Nord, in the province of Quebec, Canada.

Location

The river flows from north to south for almost  between the Natashquan River in the west and Musquaro River in the east.
The river flows for about  through the hills, then meanders through the swampy lowlands before flowing into the Gulf of St. Lawrence.
There are several rapids and waterfalls. 
It then meanders down into the marshes of the coastal plain.

The mouth of the river is in the unorganized territory of Petit-Mécatina in the Le Golfe-du-Saint-Laurent Regional County Municipality.
The small village of Kegashka and the harbor of Kegaska are  further east at the other end of Kagaska Bay.
The sandy beaches are known as an area to observe birds and marine mammals, and to gather clams.
It was needed to carry machinery for construction of an almost  section of Quebec Route 138 between Kegaska and the Natashquan River.

Name

The Innu call Kagaska Bay Tshekahkat and call the river Tshehkahkau Hipu.
These could be variants of the word tshakashekau meaning "rocky escarpment with a steep slope at its summit".
Père Arnaud says Kegasta means "bay on each side of the point".
Eugène Rouillard, in Noms géographiques de la Province de Québec et des Provinces Maritimes empruntés aux langues sauvages (1906), says it means "a peninsula".
Another source says "kegaska" comes from the Innu word "quegasca" which means "a shortcut or easy passage at high tide between the mainland and the islands".

Description

According to the Dictionnaire des rivières et lacs de la province de Québec (1914),

Basin

It lies between the basins of the Natashquan River and the Musquaro River.
It covers part of the unorganized territory of Petit-Mécatina and part of the municipality of Côte-Nord-du-Golfe-du-Saint-Laurent.
Part of the basin is in the proposed Natashquan River Valley Biodiversity Reserve.
A map of the ecological regions of Quebec shows the river in sub-regions 6n-T and 6m-T of the east spruce/moss subdomain.
Along the river the vegetation is sparse due to the harsh climate and strong winds, and in some areas the gneiss and granite bedrock is exposed.

Human use

In the past the Innu used the Kégaska River as a transportation corridor, then as a trade route during the fur trading period.
In 1702 Augustin Le Gardeur de Courtemanche obtained a concession for hunting and fishing extending from the Kegaska River to the Kessessakiou River.
Seal and whale oil were much sought after during this period for lighting.
In 1831 the Hudson's Bay Company occupied a salmon fishing and trading post at the mouth of the river.

The Kegaska River provides excellent habitat for Atlantic salmon, which can use  of the river and tributaries.
Sport fishing by boat or wading is practiced on the lowest  in four pools that are influenced by the tides. 
The first cabins of the Leslie Foreman outfitter are at the mouth of the river.
This cabin could be reached by boat, but many portages would be needed.
It is easier to reach the lake by float plane.

Notes

See also 
 Le Golfe-du-Saint-Laurent Regional County Municipality (MRC)
 Petit-Mécatina, an unorganized territory
 Kegaska Lake
 List of rivers of Quebec

Sources

Rivers of Côte-Nord